The 1964 USC Trojans baseball team represented the University of Southern California in the 1964 NCAA University Division baseball season. The Trojans played their home games at Bovard Field. The team was coached by Rod Dedeaux in his 23rd year at USC.

The Trojans won the California Intercollegiate Baseball Association championship and the District VIII Playoff to advance to the College World Series, where they were defeated by the Maine Black Bears.

Roster

Schedule 

! style="" | Regular Season
|- valign="top" 

|- align="center" bgcolor="#ccffcc"
| 1 || February 25 || at  || Matador Field • Northridge, California || 12–4 || 1–0 || 0–0
|-

|- align="center" bgcolor="#ffcccc"
| 2 || March 2 ||  || Bovard Field • Los Angeles, California || 0–6 || 1–1 || 0–0
|- align="center" bgcolor="#ccffcc"
| 3 || March 3 ||  || Bovard Field • Los Angeles, California || 5–3 || 2–1 || 0–0
|- align="center" bgcolor="#ccffcc"
| 4 || March 6 ||  || Bovard Field • Los Angeles, California || 15–4 || 3–1 || 0–0
|- align="center" bgcolor="#ffcccc"
| 5 || March 7 || San Fernando Valley State || Bovard Field • Los Angeles, California || 5–9 || 3–2 || 0–0
|- align="center" bgcolor="#ccffcc"
| 6 || March 9 ||  || Bovard Field • Los Angeles, California || 5–1 || 4–2 || 0–0
|- align="center" bgcolor="#ccffcc"
| 7 || March 13 || at  || Campus Diamond • Santa Barbara, California || 7–0 || 5–2 || 1–0
|- align="center" bgcolor="#ccffcc"
| 8 || March 14 || Santa Barbara || Bovard Field • Los Angeles, California || 8–2 || 6–2 || 2–0
|- align="center" bgcolor="#ccffcc"
| 9 || March 14 ||  || Bovard Field • Los Angeles, California || 5–0 || 7–2 || 2–0
|- align="center" bgcolor="#ffcccc"
| 10 || March 17 ||  || Bovard Field • Los Angeles, California || 2–8 || 7–3 || 2–0
|- align="center" bgcolor="#ccffcc"
| 11 || March 20 || at  || Unknown • Fresno, California || 14–7 || 8–3 || 2–0
|- align="center" bgcolor="#ffcccc"
| 12 || March 20 || at Fresno State || Unknown • Fresno, California || 3–7 || 8–4 || 2–0
|- align="center" bgcolor="#ccffcc"
| 13 || March 30 ||  || Bovard Field • Los Angeles, California || 3–2 || 9–4 || 2–0
|- align="center" bgcolor="#ccffcc"
| 14 || March 31 ||  || Bovard Field • Los Angeles, California || 8–6 || 10–4 || 2–0
|-

|- align="center" bgcolor="#ffcccc"
| 15 || April 3 || at  || Sawtelle Field • Los Angeles, California || 2–3 || 10–5 || 2–1
|- align="center" bgcolor="#ccffcc"
| 16 || April 4 || at UCLA || Sawtelle Field • Los Angeles, California || 8–4 || 11–5 || 3–1
|- align="center" bgcolor="#ccffcc"
| 17 || April 6 || Cal State Los Angeles || Bovard Field • Los Angeles, California || 4–3 || 12–5 || 3–1
|- align="center" bgcolor="#ffcccc"
| 18 || April 7 ||  || Bovard Field • Los Angeles, California || 7–2 || 12–6 || 3–1
|- align="center" bgcolor="#ffcccc"
| 19 || April 11 || at  || Buck Shaw Stadium • Santa Clara, California || 2–7 || 12–7 || 3–2
|- align="center" bgcolor="#ccffcc"
| 20 || April 11 || at Santa Clara || Buck Shaw Stadium • Santa Clara, California || 3–0 || 13–7 || 4–2
|- align="center" bgcolor="#ccffcc"
| 21 || April 13 || at  || Sunken Diamond • Stanford, California || 3–2 || 14–7 || 5–2
|- align="center" bgcolor="#ffcccc"
| 22 || April 14 || at Long Beach State || Blair Field • Long Beach, California || 8–9 || 14–8 || 5–2
|- align="center" bgcolor="#ccffcc"
| 23 || April 17 || Santa Clara || Bovard Field • Los Angeles, California || 7–3 || 15–8 || 6–2
|- align="center" bgcolor="#ccffcc"
| 24 || April 18 ||  || Bovard Field • Los Angeles, California || 10–7 || 16–8 || 7–2
|- align="center" bgcolor="#ccffcc"
| 25 || April 18 || California || Bovard Field • Los Angeles, California || 4–2 || 17–8 || 8–2
|- align="center" bgcolor="#ccffcc"
| 26 || April 20 || Cal Poly Pomona || Bovard Field • Los Angeles, California || 14–1 || 18–8 || 8–2
|- align="center" bgcolor="#ccffcc"
| 27 || April 24 || Santa Clara || Bovard Field • Los Angeles, California || 8–3 || 19–8 || 9–2
|- align="center" bgcolor="#ccffcc"
| 28 || April 25 || Stanford || Bovard Field • Los Angeles, California || 5–4 || 20–8 || 10–2
|- align="center" bgcolor="#ccffcc"
| 29 || April 25 || Stanford || Bovard Field • Los Angeles, California || 115–4 || 21–8 || 11–2
|- align="center" bgcolor="#ccffcc"
| 30 || April 28 || Santa Barbara || Bovard Field • Los Angeles, California || 10–1 || 22–8 || 12–2
|-

|- align="center" bgcolor="#ffcccc"
| 31 || May 1 || UCLA || Bovard Field • Los Angeles, California || 2–7 || 22–9 || 12–3
|- align="center" bgcolor="#ccffcc"
| 32 || May 2 || UCLA || Bovard Field • Los Angeles, California || 8–7 || 23–9 || 13–3
|- align="center" bgcolor="#ccffcc"
| 33 || May 5 || at Santa Barbara || Campus Diamond • Santa Barbara, California || 13–5 || 24–9 || 14–3
|- align="center" bgcolor="#ccffcc"
| 34 || May 8 || at Stanford || Sunken Diamond • Stanford, California || 9–2 || 25–9 || 15–3
|- align="center" bgcolor="#ccffcc"
| 35 || May 9 || at California || Edwards Field • Berkeley, California || 8–2 || 26–9 || 16–3
|- align="center" bgcolor="#ccffcc"
| 36 || May 9 || at California || Edwards Field • Berkeley, California || 4–3 || 27–9 || 17–3
|- align="center" bgcolor="#ccffcc"
| 37 || May 15 || Pepperdine || Bovard Field • Los Angeles, California || 3–2 || 28–9 || 17–3
|-

|-
! style="" | Postseason
|- valign="top"

|- align="center" bgcolor="#ccffcc"
| 38 || May 22 || Cal Poly Pomona || Bovard Field • Los Angeles, California || 12–3 || 29–9 || 17–3
|- align="center" bgcolor="#ccffcc"
| 39 || May 23 || Cal Poly Pomona || Bovard Field • Los Angeles, California || 5–2 || 30–9 || 17–3
|- align="center" bgcolor="#ccffcc"
| 40 || May 29 ||  || Bovard Field • Los Angeles, California || 5–0 || 31–9 || 17–3
|- align="center" bgcolor="#ccffcc"
| 41 || May 30 || Oregon || Bovard Field • Los Angeles, California || 9–3 || 32–9 || 17–3
|-

|- align="center" bgcolor="#ccffcc"
| 42 || June 9 || vs Ole Miss || Omaha Municipal Stadium • Omaha, Nebraska || 3–2 || 33–9 || 17–3
|- align="center" bgcolor="#ccffcc"
| 43 || June 12 || vs Missouri || Omaha Municipal Stadium • Omaha, Nebraska || 3–2 || 34–9 || 17–3
|- align="center" bgcolor="#ffcccc"
| 44 || June 13 || vs Minnesota || Omaha Municipal Stadium • Omaha, Nebraska || 5–6 || 34–10 || 17–3
|- align="center" bgcolor="#ffcccc"
| 45 || June 15 || vs  || Omaha Municipal Stadium • Omaha, Nebraska || 1–2 || 34–11 || 17–3
|-

Awards and honors 
Joe Austin
 First Team All-CIBA

Willie Brown
 College World Series All-Tournament Team
 Second Team All-CIBA

Bud Hollowell
 Second Team All-American American Baseball Coaches Association
 Second Team All-CIBA

Marty Piscovich
 Honorable Mention All-CIBA

Walt Peterson
 First Team All-American American Baseball Coaches Association
 First Team All-American The Sports Network
 First Team All-CIBA

Larry Sandel
 Second Team All-CIBA

Gary Sutherland
 Third Team All-American American Baseball Coaches Association
 College World Series All-Tournament Team
 First Team All-CIBA

References 

USC Trojans baseball seasons
USC Trojans baseball
College World Series seasons
USC
Pac-12 Conference baseball champion seasons